Temple Herdewyke is a village in Warwickshire, England, that was built to house staff at Defence Munitions (DM) Kineton. It forms part of the parish of Burton Dassett.

External links

Villages in Warwickshire